This list comprises all players who have participated in at least one league match for Nashville Metros in the USL Premier Development League since the USL began keeping detailed records in 2003. Players who were on the roster but never played a first team game are not listed; players who appeared for the team in other competitions (US Open Cup, etc.) but never actually made an USL appearance are noted at the bottom of the page where appropriate.

A
  Tyson Adkinson
  Jesus Aleman
  Carey Alexander
  Trey Alexander
  Chris Anderson
  Jon-Pierre Anthony
  Mito Ara
  Nacho Ara
  Richard Askey
  Jay Ayres

B
  Jaymi Bailey
  Kalin Bankov
  Luis Berbari
  Michael Bolt
  Ian Borders
  Corey Boyd
  Jeff Boynton
  Jason Bristol
  Ryan Bristol
  Camden Brown
  T. J. Brown
  Ben Buerger
  Charles Burns
  Benjamin Bussell

C
  Francisco Cano
  Patrick Carroll
  Fernando Castellanos
  Turan Cengiz
  Volkon Cengiz
  Angel Chairez
  Andrew Chamberlain
  Brian Charnock
  Christopher Cogan
  Harrison Cheatham* 
  Tawanda Chitapa
  Joshua Cline
  Bradley Cobbs
  Obed Compean
  Chris Creger
  Jomo Cromwell

D
  James Danko
  Miguel DaSilva
  Scott Davidson
  Dustin Dawes
  John DeBrito
  Randy Dedini *
  Danny DeVall
  Neal Dixon
  Jeff Dominguez
  Mauricio Dos Santos
  Andrew Ducker

E
  Gabe Eastman*
  Cyrus Eaton
  Albert Edward
  Jonathan Edwards
  Samuel Ekeme

F
  Jakob Fenger-Larsen
  Benjamin Fisher
  Michael Flynn
  Steven Franklin

G
  Antonio Garibaldo
  Stephen Gathany
  Tim Geltz *
  Joey German
  Edward Gilbert
  Stanley Githaiga
  Nick Glaser
  Fynn Glover
  Jacob Goergen
  Adam Goldie
  Eddie Gonzalez
  Phillip Goodrum *
  William Gordon
  Sean Goulding
  Lee Grant

H
  William Hale
  Scott Hanger
  Joe Hatcher
  Kevan Hawkins
  Rijad Heldić
  Benjamin Hemkens
  Joshua Hill
  James Holt
  Paul Hopkins
  Jeff Houser

I
 Ivailo Ilarionov

J
  Brian Johnson
  Darryl Johnson

K
  Daniel Kelly
  Pasi Kinturi
  Tony Kirk
  Cory Kirkspell *
  Harrison Kiser
  Steve Klein*

L
  Alejandro Lapalma
  Kezi Lara
  Jacob Letsholo
  Alex Lorenz
  Bryan Lowder
 Michael LaBerge

M
  Adam Macdonald
  Francisco Maciel
  Rodrigo Maciel
  William Maddox
  Andreas Maier
  Michael Marten
  Johan Martinez
  Landy Mattison
  Kenneth Mayo
  T. J. McCallum
  Ryan McDonald
  Patrick McFarland
  Kieran McFadden
  Garrett McLaughlin
  Andrew Metcalf
  Fabricio Montalvan
  Adam Montgomery
  Mariano Monzu
  Will Moorad
  Chris Mormon
  Stephen Morrissey
  Richard Mulrooney*
  Stephen Murray

N
  Lee Nadeau
  Gift Ndam
  Chase Nieri

O
  Natanael Oropeza
  Billy Otieno

P
  Neto Padilla
  Josh Pantazelos
  Michael Jason Parks
  Keith Parrish
  Daniel Payne
  Jared Peeler
  Zachary Petersen
  Mark Photivihok
  Jeffrey Porter
  Jonah Powers-Myszka

R
  Nolan Reategui
  Tanner Redden
  Martin Reynders *
  Bryan Robbins
  Samuel Roca
  J. P. Rodrigues
  Kyle Roelke
  Wade Roepke
  Jason Roufs
  Russell Runyeon

S
  Miguel Saavedra
  David Said
  Bryan Sanchez
  Eder Sanchez
  Daryl Sattler
  Dominic Schell
  Jeff Schield
  Fritz Seilbea
  Dimitry Shamootin
  Brian Shepherd
  Toni Siikala
  Ryon Simon
  Karter Smith
  Santiago Snellgrose
  Jonah Stewart
  Joshua Stewart
  Igor Stjepicd
  Jason Stubblefield
  Tyler Suffron

T
  Daniel Tackling
  Sambou Tamba
  George Teren
  Mark Thienel
  Ryan Troglen
  Carter Truax

V
  Xander Vooys

W
  James Wall
  Patrick White
  Daniel Williams
  Terrence Williams
  Brandon Wright

Sources

2010 Nashville Metros stats

References

Nashville Metros
 
Association football player non-biographical articles